There have been three baronetcies created for people with the surname Mills, all in the Baronetage of the United Kingdom. Two of the titles are extant.

 Mills baronets of Hillingdon (1868): see Baron Hillingdon
 Mills baronets of Ebbw Vale (1921)
 Mills baronet of Alcester (1953) see Viscount Mills

Set index articles on titles of nobility
Extinct baronetcies in the Baronetage of the United Kingdom
Baronetcies in the Baronetage of the United Kingdom